Mandi Mohalla, K.T.Street or Ashoka Road, is a suburb of Mysore city in Karnataka state of India.

Location
Mandi Mohalla township is located in the downtown area of Mysore city.  It is on the eastern side of Mysore Junction railway station and on the northern side of Mysore bus station.  The southern boundary of Mandi Mohalla is the Irwin Road and northern end is Bannimantap, There are many masjid in the area, most famous being Masjid E Azam built in 1925 situated in Ashoka Road, Jamiya Masjid built in 1927 situated on Irwin Road, Dargahi masjid builded in late 1950's or 60's in Sawday Road.

Economy
Mandi Mohalla is kind of second hand market popular for mobile telephones, accessories and repair shops. Fake CDs and duplicate electronic products are often sold here. Crime rate is very high in Mandi Mohalla and is considered the most crime prone area of Mysore. There is a separate police station here.

Post Office
There is a post office at Mandi Mohalla and the postal code is 570021.
The main roads in Mandi Mohalla are Ashoka Road, Geetha Road and the K.T.Street. 
The main tourist attraction is the St. Philomena's Cathedral, Mysore.

Important Streets
 Kali Temple Street
 Kabir Road
 Akbar Road Cross
 Ashoka Road
 Sawday Road
 Turabali Street
 Pulikeshi Road
 Anegundi Road
 Cove Road
 Erekette Street
 Eshwari Temple Road
 Benki Nawab Street

Image gallery

See also
 Devaraj Urs Road, Mysore
 Dewan's Road, Mysore
 Hanumanthanagar
 Mysore North, Naidu Nagar
 St. Philomena's Cathedral, Mysore
 St. Philomena's College, Mysore

References

Mysore North
Suburbs of Mysore